Gorytini is a large and morphologically very diverse group of hunting wasps distributed worldwide and particularly species-rich in tropical areas. Most species hunt various hemipterans, especially among the Auchenorrhyncha, which they sting, paralyze, and provision in underground nests as food for their larvae.

Taxonomy

The Catalog of Sphecidae doesn't recognise Gorytini as a tribe and instead places the genera in subtribes Exeirina, Gorytina, Handlirschina and Spheciina within tribe Bembicini.

 Gorytina
Afrogorytes
Allogorytes
Arigorytes
Aroliagorytes
Austrogortyes
Eogorytes
Epigorytes
Gorytes (=Leiogorytes, =Pseudoplisus)
Hapalomellinus
Harpactostigma
Harpactus
Hoplisoides
Lestiphorus
Leurogorytes
Liogorytes
Megistommum
Oryttus
Psammaecius
Psammaletes
Sagenista
Saygorytes
Stenogorytes
Stethogorytes
Tretogorytes
Trichogorytes
Xerogorytes

Exeirina
Argogorytes (=Malaygorytes)
Clitemnestra
Exeirus
Neogorytes
Olgia
Paraphilanthus

Handlirshina
Handlirschia
Pterygorytes

 Spheciina
Ammatomus
Kohlia
Sphecius
Tanyoprymnus

Trachogorytes is recognised as a synonym of Mellinus, a genus of crabronid wasps in subfamily Mellininae and tribe Mellinini

References

Bugguide.net. Subtribe Gorytina

External links

Crabronidae
Hymenoptera tribes
Biological pest control wasps